Cedar Hill Independent School District (CHISD) is a public school district based in Cedar Hill, Texas, United States. The district superintendent is Dr. Gerald Hudson.

Catchment, demographics and history
Cedar Hill ISD serves 36 square miles - Most of the city of Cedar Hill and portions of Grand Prairie, Ovilla, Duncanville and Dallas.

The District has 61 buses and 2,270 daily bus riders.

Cedar Hill ISD was established in 1904, with just one campus, when it enacted a special school tax per new law. The District counted 273 students in 1922–23. In the 1930s, the first Parent Teacher's Association was organized, and Mrs. Haswell was the first president. Bray Elementary is the District's original Elementary campus. It was named in honor of Ms. Floy Bray (1889-1985). The current Cedar Hill High School was built in 1978.

The Student Ethnic Composition—66.14% African-American, 24.64% Hispanic, 4.02% White, 3.7% Two or More Races, 1.13% Asian, .27 American Indian, .09 Native Hawaiian/Pacific Islander. Seventeen languages are represented at CHISD.

Academic standards
In 2018–2019, the school district was rated "B" by the Texas Education Agency.

Below are the A-F TEA Ratings for the individual campuses.

Schools

High schools (2)
Cedar Hill High School- C
Cedar Hill Collegiate High School - Opened in 2008. - A

Middle schools (3)
W.S. Permenter Middle School-C Opened in 1989 and named in honor of former CHISD Superintendent W.S. Permenter (1928-2007).
Bessie Coleman Middle School-C Opened in 2005 and named in honor of Bessie Coleman (1892-1926), the first woman of African-American and Native American descent to have a pilot license.
Cedar Hill Collegiate Academy - A

Elementary schools (7)
Collegiate Prep Elementary - B
Bray Elementary School-C Located in downtown Cedar Hill at the original site of the school district and named in honor of Floy Bray (1889-1985), a first grade teacher in CHISD.
Highlands Elementary School-B - Home to the CHISD Elementary Bilingual Program.
High Pointe Elementary School-F - Opened in 1986, with renovations in 2001–02.
Lake Ridge Elementary School-B - Opened in 2002, the newest elementary campus in CHISD.
Plummer Elementary School-B - Opened in 1973 as South Hills Elementary and renamed in 1980, in honor of Rosa Belle Plummer (1914-2005), who taught at Bray Elementary from 1935-to-1980 (45 years).
Waterford Oaks Elementary School-C - Opened in 1990 and renovated in 2001–02.

References

External links

Cedar Hill ISD - Official site.

Cedar Hill ISD Education Foundation - official site

School districts in Dallas County, Texas